Sativasur is a town and municipality in the Colombian Department of Boyacá, part of the subregion of the Northern Boyacá Province. It is approximately 132 km from Tunja, the capital of the department. Sativasur borders the municipalities Sativanorte in the north, Socotá in the east and Paz de Río in the south and west.

History 
Sativanorte and Sativasur were called Sátiva in the times before the Spanish conquest of the Muisca on the central highlands (Altiplano Cundiboyacense) of Colombia. Sátiva was inhabited during the Herrera Period and later ruled by the cacique of Tundama, today known as Duitama and part of the Muisca Confederation, the former country of the Muisca. The Spanish conquistadores who conquered the area in 1540 were Gonzalo Suárez Rendón and Hernán Pérez de Quesada. Sativasur was properly founded on January 30, 1720.

The names for Sativasur and Sativanorte are derived from the cacique Sátiva, which in the Chibcha language of the Muisca means: "Captain of the Sun".

Economy 
The main economical activities of the village are agriculture, livestock farming and mining.

Gallery

References 

Municipalities of Boyacá Department
Populated places established in 1720
1720 establishments in the Spanish Empire
Muisca Confederation
Muysccubun